The White Night of St. Petersburg is a novelised biography of Grand Duke Nicholas Kostantinovich Romanov set in Russia at the end of the 19th century and start of the 20th century.

It tells the story of Nicholas, the elder brother of Olga, Queen of Greece, through the eyes of Nicholas's granddaughter Princess Natalja Alexandrovna Iskander. It is written by Prince Michael of Greece (Queen Olga's grandson), who met Princess Natalja shortly before her death in 1999.

The book contains a lot of period detail and family history of the Romanovs.

Biographical novels
Biographies about royalty